General elections were held in Bermuda from 2 to 4 June 1948. Women had been given the right to vote and stand for election in 1944 and had been able to vote in a by-election in Paget in the same year. This was the first general election in which they could vote and be candidates.

There were around 4,120 electors, although this included many property owners who were allowed more than one registration to vote.

Results
Two women were elected, Hilda Aitken and Edna Watson.

References

1948 elections in North America
1948 in Bermuda
Elections in Bermuda
Election and referendum articles with incomplete results